William Gairdner may refer to:

William Gairdner (physician) (1793–1867), physician
William Tennant Gairdner (1824–1907), physician
William Henry Temple Gairdner (1873–1928), missionary
Bill Gairdner  (born 1940), athlete

See also
Gairdner (surname)
William Gardiner (disambiguation)
William Gardner (disambiguation)